The Cumberland flag is the flag of the historic county of Cumberland. It was registered with the Flag Institute as the flag of the county in December 2012.



Design
The flag is based on the pattern of the arms of the former Cumberland County Council, originally granted by the College of Arms on 19 September 1950, namely:

Per fesse vert and barry wavy of six Argent and Azure in chief three Parnassus Flowers proper.

The Parnassus flower is a wild flower of the marshy uplands and was chosen as the county flower of Cumberland, growing here on a green field.  The wavy blue and white stripes in base represent the coastline and the famed lakes of the county.

External links
[ Flag Institute – Cumberland]
Cumberland Flag Facebook Page

References

Cumberland
Cumberland
Cumberland